The Two Paths is a 1911 American short silent drama film directed by D. W. Griffith, starring Dorothy Bernard and featuring Blanche Sweet. A print of the film survives in the film archive of the Museum of Modern Art.

Cast
 Dorothy Bernard as Florence
 Wilfred Lucas as Nellie's Husband
 Adolph Lestina as Temptor
 Clara T. Bracy as Mother
 Donald Crisp as Footman
 Blanche Sweet

See also
 D. W. Griffith filmography
 Blanche Sweet filmography

References

External links

1911 films
American silent short films
Biograph Company films
American black-and-white films
1911 drama films
1911 short films
Films directed by D. W. Griffith
Silent American drama films
1910s American films